Liu Yu's Northern Expeditions were a series of successful campaigns mounted by the Eastern Jin dynasty from 409 AD to 416 AD against the Southern Yan, Later Qin, Northern Wei and Hu Xia dynasties that successfully recovered all of Eastern Jin's territory south of the Yellow River with the exception of the Chang'an area, which was taken by Hu Xia. These victories were the basis of the prosperity of the Reign of Yuanjia.

Background

Following the Eastern Jin's victory at the Battle of Fei River, North China divided into several dynastic states ruled by non-Han peoples. After Liu Yu, one of the most excellent generals of the time, came to power in the Eastern Jin, Liu Yu saw the opportunity to recover the former territories held by the Western Jin dynasty.

Expeditions

1st expedition against Southern Yan

Liu Yu's first expedition was against Southern Yan in 409 CE. The Eastern Jin army attacked from Nanjing to Xiapei, and then to Longchen. Along the roads, Eastern Jin's forces built fortresses to prevent Southern Yan forces from cutting off their supplies. They engaged Southern Yan forces at the Battle of Linqu, winning decisively. By May, Eastern Jin forces reached the Southern Yan capital at Guanggu. When he reached the area, Liu Yu saw that the ground was covered with grain and he said to his men that: "The Southern Yan ruler is already in my hand", as there would be no supply problems. In February 410 CE, Eastern Jin forces captured Guanggu and put an end to Southern Yan.

2nd expedition against Later Qin

In 416 CE, Liu Yu launched a major attack against Later Qin, defeating its general, Yao Shao. After this victory, Liu Yu recovered Luoyang, the former capital of the Western Jin dynasty and was crowned Duke of Song. To complete his victory, he sent two armies into Shaanxi to engage the remnants of Later Qin's forces.

On their way there, the Eastern Jin forces were harassed by Northern Wei cavalry, who attacked the Eastern Jin forces' supply routes. In a major engagement, Eastern Jin forces defeated Northern Wei forces using crossbows to launch spears through the Northern Wei forces, frightening them and reputedly killing some 30,000 Wei soldiers. Following this victory, Eastern Jin forces continued on Later Qin and captured its capital Chang'an, destroying it.

Loss of Chang'an region

Following this victory, it seemed that the Eastern Jin would quickly destroy Hu Xia, Northern Wei and the remaining non-Han states, reunifying China proper. However, Liu Yu went back to Nanjing on rumors of the death of Emperor An of Jin, leaving his general Wang Zhen'e in charge. Hu Xia forces took the opportunity to attack, and captured the Chang'an region from the Eastern Jin. Nevertheless, the Eastern Jin still held most of the territories south of the Yellow River.

Aftermath

These victories laid the foundation for the Reign of Yuanjia, a period of relative prosperity brought about by diminished threats of invasion or constant warfare.

References

Sources

Book of Song.

5th century in China
Jin dynasty (266–420)
400s
410s
409
416